Homer Morrison Byington Jr. (born 1908 Naples, Italy, died November 1, 1987) was the first American Ambassador to newly independent Malaya, now Malaysia, from 1957 to 1961.  After he left Malaya, he was Consul General in Naples until he retired.

He graduated from Phillips Academy and Yale College. His father, Homer M. Byington, served in the U.S. consular service for 47 years. He is descended from A. Homer Byington.

Byington was married to Jane McHarg, and they had a son, Homer M. Byington, III. He died of a heart attack while aboard the Norwegian cruise ship Vista Fjord in the Atlantic Ocean at the age of 79 years old and had lived in Soto Grande, Spain.

References

External links
The Association for Diplomatic Studies and Training Foreign Affairs Oral History Program Foreign Service Spouse Series JANE BYINGTON
Their Country's Call: The Byington, McHarg, and Porter Families in War and Peace

Phillips Academy alumni
Yale College alumni
Ambassadors of the United States to Malaysia
1908 births
1987 deaths
American expatriates in Italy